Anne Walker was a British astronomer and one of the first women employed in paid routine work in astronomy in her country. She was one of a number of women computers employed at Cambridge Observatory between 1876 and 1904. Unlike most of these women, Walker remained at the observatory for a significant period of time.

Walker was born at Wickham Market, Suffolk in 1864. She was employed by the observatory in 1879 at the age of 15, and remained there for 24 years, working under astronomers John Couch Adams and Robert Stawell Ball. She worked most directly with the observatory's senior assistant at the time, Andrew Graham. The observatory necessitated that only two observers worked at any one time. Up until 1892, Walker substituted for Graham's current assistant Henry Todd when Todd's ill health prevented him from observing. That Walker was making transit observations with the meridian circle in the mid-1880s is clear from an observatory report that stated her work was interrupted by an earth tremor on 22 April 1884, when she had to stop while wires in the eyepiece vibrated. From 1892, Walker became Graham's observation partner and from 1894 to 1896, she observed alone.

Andrew Graham retired in 1903 at the age of eighty-eight. Anne Walker resigned at the same time as him, bringing her astronomical career at the Cambridge Observatory to an end after 21 years.

It has been suggested that Walker was much more than a routine computer, and that she took part in observations with Graham. If true, this makes her the second woman (after Caroline Herschel) to have been recorded formally engaging in night-time astronomical observations.

References

1864 births
19th-century British astronomers
20th-century British astronomers
Human computers
People from Suffolk Coastal (district)
Women astronomers
Year of death missing